Jeffrey Todd Glor (born July 12, 1975) is an American journalist, co-host of CBS Saturday Morning  and a CBS News special correspondent. He had previously anchored the CBS Evening News from 2017 to 2019.

Early life and education
Glor was born in Buffalo, New York, where he attended Kenmore East High School, a public high school in his hometown of Tonawanda, New York. He graduated from Syracuse University in 1997 with dual degrees in journalism (from the S.I. Newhouse School of Public Communications) and economics. At Syracuse, he was awarded the Henry J. Wolff prize, given to the Newhouse student "most proficient in journalism.”

Life and career
Glor was co-anchor of WSTM-TV Syracuse's 5 p.m. newscast and a reporter for the 11 p.m. newscast (2000–2003). He was the morning news anchor from 1997 to 2000. He joined WSTM as a part-time producer while still attending college. Glor was named "Best Male News Anchor" by Syracuse New Times and one of the 40 most promising professionals under the age of 40. Glor was a contributing researcher and writer on The Legal Handbook for N.Y. State Journalists. He served as weekend evening news anchor and weekday reporter for WHDH in Boston from 2003 to 2007.

He joined CBS News in 2007 as co-anchor, and later newsreader, on the Saturday Early Show. He also reported primarily for the weekday version of The Early Show, including an extended period in Iraq, China, and on the presidential campaign in 2008. From 2008 rotating with Russ Mitchell until 2009 to 2010, he anchored the CBS Saturday Evening News. Also in 2009, he began to report for other broadcasts, including the CBS Evening News and CBS Sunday Morning, for which he won an Emmy.

He served as news anchor for The Early Show from January 2011 to January 2012. Following that in 2012, he anchored the Saturday edition of the newly launched CBS This Morning, the successor to The Early Show, and also began to focus reporting on long-form stories as a correspondent for CBS This Morning.  From 2012 to 2016, he anchored the CBS Sunday Evening News, and from 2013 to 2014, he was the correspondent on extended investigations for the CBS Evening News, including recalls at General Motors and Takata. In 2015 and 2016, he contributed a wide range of stories to 60 Minutes Sports. He also began filling in for Charlie Rose on his eponymous show on PBS.

On October 25, 2017, CBS announced that Glor would become the new permanent anchor for the CBS Evening News in late 2017, replacing Scott Pelley, who left the position in June 2017. (Anthony Mason had been anchoring the program on an interim basis after Pelley's departure.) Glor became the new permanent weekday anchor of the CBS Evening News on December 4, 2017.

In December 2017, Glor interviewed French President Emmanuel Macron at the One Planet Summit in Paris, following Donald Trump's decision to pull the U.S. out of the 2015 Paris Accords. That night he broadcast the Evening News live from the  Élysée Palace, a first for any American network.

On May 29, 2018, the CBS Evening News with Jeff Glor revived the in-depth segment "Eye on America", first launched by CBS News in 1991. Produced by domestic news bureaus, the immersive reports focus on key issues such as the role of teachers in the age of mass shootings, sanctuary cities, opioid addiction, and more.

On May 6, 2019, Susan Zirinsky, president of CBS News, announced that, beginning in the summer, Norah O'Donnell would be the new anchor and managing editor of the CBS Evening News and that the network was "discussing opportunities" for Glor to remain at CBS News. His last broadcast of the CBS Evening News was May 10, 2019, whereupon he wished O'Donnell "the best of luck" and paid tribute to the behind-the-scenes team by running full staff credits. Rotating series of anchors anchored on an interim basis.

Starting June 22, 2019, Glor joined Dana Jacobson and Michelle Miller as co-host of CBS This Morning: Saturday, later retitled CBS Saturday Morning, and is also serving as a CBS News special correspondent reporting feature stories and investigative reports for the network.

Personal life
A fan of the Buffalo Bills, on August 30, 2011, he interviewed the former Bills head coach Marv Levy on The Early Show.

Glor and his wife, Nicole (née Glab), a fitness instructor and former college cheerleader, whom he met at Syracuse University, live in Greenwich, Connecticut and have two children: a son and a daughter. Glor's brother, Richard, is an expert on lizard evolution and is the Curator of Herpetology at the Kansas University Biodiversity Institute and Museum of Natural History.

See also
 New Yorkers in journalism

References

External links

1975 births
Living people
Television personalities from Buffalo, New York
People from Tonawanda, New York
American reporters and correspondents
American television news anchors
S.I. Newhouse School of Public Communications alumni
News & Documentary Emmy Award winners
American male journalists
CBS News people
Journalists from New York (state)